This was the first edition of the tournament.

Pablo Carreño Busta won the tournament, defeating Matteo Viola in the final, 6–2, 6–2.

Seeds

Draw

Finals

Top half

Bottom half

External links
 Main Draw
 Qualifying Draw

Blu-Express.com Tennis Cup - Singles
2015 Singles